David Swenson Hogness (November 17, 1925 – December 24, 2019) was an American biochemist, geneticist, and developmental biologist and emeritus professor at the Stanford University School of Medicine in Stanford, California.

Life
Hogness spent most of his youth in Chicago, the son of Thorfin R. Hogness and Phoebe S. Hogness. His parents were both children of immigrants and graduates of the University of Minnesota; his father later received a PhD in chemistry from the University of California at Berkeley, taught at Berkeley and in 1930 joined the faculty at the University of Chicago.

After service in the Navy, David Hogness acquired his bachelor's degree in chemistry in 1949 at the California Institute of Technology (Caltech); and in 1952, his PhD in biology and chemistry. As a postdoctoral fellow, he worked with a scholarship of the National Research Council with Jacques Monod at the Pasteur Institute in Paris, and with a grant from the National Science Foundation at the New York University in New York City.

In 1955, Hogness became an instructor of microbiology at Washington University in St. Louis, Missouri, and was promoted to an assistant professor in 1957. In 1959, he moved to Stanford University School of Medicine. In 1961 he became an associate professor and in 1966, he was promoted to full professor of biochemistry. In 1989 he also became a joint faculty member in Stanford's newly created Department of Developmental Biology.  He was professor emeritus since 1999.

Hogness married Judith Gore in 1948; the couple had two sons.

Research
Hogness was essential to understanding the ontogeny of Drosophila melanogaster (fruit fly). He examined the role of the hormone ecdysone in the development of the fruit fly. In 1978, Hogness and his group identified the TATA box (Goldberg-Hogness box) as the start sequence for the transcription of genes in eukaryotes. Hogness' work contributed to the discovery that the genetic material of eukaryotes consists of non-coding (introns) and coding (exons) sections and that the expression of numerous genes is regulated by so-called cis-elements. Hogness contributed to the fusion of genetics, molecular biology and developmental biology.

Awards
1965 Newcomb Cleveland Prize
1968 Guggenheim Fellow
1976 Member of the National Academy of Sciences
1976 Member of the American Academy of Arts and Sciences
1977 Howard Taylor Ricketts Award
1979 Harvey Lecturer
1984 Genetics Society of America Medal
1992 Membership of the European Molecular Biology Organization (EMBO)
1995 Humboldt Research Award
1995 Darwin Prize Visiting Professor, University of Edinburgh
1997 March of Dimes Prize in Developmental Biology
2003 Thomas Hunt Morgan Medal
2007 International Prize for Biology

References

External links
 David S. Hogness and Lebenslauf (PDF, 221 kB, Stand 2000) at  Stanford University (stanford.edu)

1925 births
2019 deaths
American biochemists
Stanford University School of Medicine faculty
Fellows of the American Academy of Arts and Sciences
California Institute of Technology alumni
Academics of the University of Edinburgh
Developmental biologists
Washington University School of Medicine faculty